Zhai Zhigang (born 11 October 1966) is a Chinese major general of the People's Liberation Army Strategic Support Force (PLASSF) in active service as a People's Liberation Army Astronaut Corps (PLAAC) taikonaut. During the Shenzhou 7 mission in 2008, he became the first Chinese citizen to carry out a spacewalk. He was a People's Liberation Army Air Force (PLAAF) fighter pilot.

Air Force career 
Zhai was born in Longjiang County, Heilongjiang Province. He enrolled at the PLA Air Force Aviation University and studied to be a fighter pilot and then as a squadron leader. Zhai became a lieutenant colonel and pilot trainer in the PLAAF after logging 1000 hours of flying time.

Astronaut Corps career
In 1996, Zhai was selected to trial for the taikonaut program and was selected to be the first group of fourteen in 1998. He was one of three members of the final group to train for the Shenzhou 5 flight. Yang Liwei was picked for the flight, with Zhai Zhigang ranked second ahead of Nie Haisheng. Zhai was one of the six taikonauts in the final training for Shenzhou 6. The Ta Kung Pao newspaper had reported that Zhai Zhigang and Nie Haisheng were the leading pair, after having been in the final group of three for Shenzhou 5. However, Zhai had been paired with Wu Jie during training. Fei Junlong and Nie Haisheng flew the flight.

Zhai, along with Liu Boming and Jing Haipeng was selected for prime crew on Shenzhou 7, with Zhai as commander, on 17 September 2008. On 25 September 2008, at 21:10 CST, they launched into space as the first three-man crew for China, China's third human spaceflight mission. On 27 September 2008, Zhai became the first Chinese astronaut to spacewalk, completely outside the craft. Fellow crew member Liu Boming stood by at the airlock and could be seen straddling the portal. Zhai successfully completed his spacewalk at 18:25 CST. Zhai wore the Chinese developed Feitian space suit, while Liu wore the Russian derived Orlan-M space suit.

Zhai was selected as commander to fly on the Shenzhou 13 alongside Wang Yaping and Ye Guangfu as his second spaceflight mission to the Tiangong space station. On 7 November 2021, Zhai carried out his second spacewalk alongside Wang who became China's first woman to perform a spacewalk. On 26 December 2021, Zhai carried out his third spacewalk with Ye.

Personal life 
Zhai's favourite pastimes are calligraphy, dancing and gadgets. He is married to Zhang Shujing and has one son.

See also 
 List of Chinese taikonauts

References

External links 

 
 Zhai Zhigang at the Encyclopedia Astronautica. Accessed 22 July 2005.
 Spacefacts biography of Zhai Zhigang

1966 births
People's Liberation Army Astronaut Corps
Living people
Shenzhou program astronauts
Shenzhou 7
Extravehicular activity
People from Qiqihar
People's Liberation Army Air Force generals
People's Liberation Army generals from Heilongjiang
PLA Air Force Aviation University alumni
Spacewalkers